Baitul Mukarram Mosque is a mosque in Karachi, Pakistan.  It is located in Block 8 Gulshan e Iqbal, Karachi. It is near Urdu University and Expo Center Karachi.

Baitul Mukarram Masjid has an Islamic educational institute within the mosque, where students can get Islamic education. The mosque and its associated area covers about five acres. Mosque having library, dispensary and hostel.

References

External links

Jama Masjid Bait ul Mukarram | Gulshan Iqbal | Karachi, YouTube video

Mosques in Karachi